The Bliss-Leavitt Mark 4 torpedo was a Bliss-Leavitt torpedo developed and produced by the E. W. Bliss Company in 1908. It was the first American-built torpedo specifically designed to be launched from a submarine. About 100 Mark 4s were purchased for experimental purposes by the United States Navy, which led to design improvements to the gyro and the reducing valve. It was used on submarines of the C and D classes.  The Mark 4, and all other torpedoes designed before the Bliss-Leavitt Mark 7 torpedo, were considered obsolete and withdrawn from service in 1922.

See also
American 18 inch torpedo

References

Torpedoes
Torpedoes of the United States
Unmanned underwater vehicles
Bliss-Leavitt torpedoes